Nicholas Richard Hobson (born 22 August 1994) is an Australian cricketer who represents the Perth Scorchers in the Big Bash League. He made his Twenty20 debut for the Perth Scorchers against the Sydney Thunder on 24 January 2019 during the 2018-19 Big Bash League season. He made his List A debut on 2 March 2021, for Western Australia in the 2020–21 Marsh One-Day Cup.

References

External links

Living people
1994 births
Australian cricketers
Cricketers from Perth, Western Australia
Perth Scorchers cricketers
Western Australia cricketers